Phil Agcaoili is a technologist, an entrepreneur, and a cyber security, information security, and privacy expert.

Agcaoili co-founded SecureIT and sold it to VeriSign in 199

Education 
Phil Agcaoili graduated from Columbia High School in East Greenbush, New York, in 1989, studied aerospace engineering at Virginia Tech in Blacksburg, Virginia, received a Bachelor of Science in mechanical engineering from Rensselaer Polytechnic Institute in Troy, New York, in 1993, and attended Georgia State University in Atlanta, Georgia, for an MBA in computer information systems. He was inducted into the Mechanical Engineering Honor Society Pi Tau Sigma in 1991 at Rensselaer Polytechnic Institute and was inducted into the East Greenbush Education Foundation Hall of Fame in 2011.

Career 
Agcaoili started his career at General Electric.

He co-founded and was the Chief Information Security Officer of SecureIT in 1996. SecureIT was acquired by Verisign in 1998 for $70M. After the acquisition, he became VeriSign's first CISO. He was an early foundation member at Internet Devices, which was acquired by Alcatel in 1999 for $180M. He was the Chief Security Architect  at Scientific-Atlanta, which was acquired by Cisco in 2005 for $6.9B.

He co-founded the Southern CISO Security Council in 2006.

While at Dell in 2008, he set security standards for Cloud computing as a Founding Member and Steering Committee member of the Cloud Security Alliance. He co-invented and co-authored the Cloud Controls Matrix (CCM) in 2009 (versions 1.0, 1.1, and 1.2), co-founded the GRC Stack in 2010, and co-founded the Security, Trust & Assurance Registry (STAR) in 2011.

Agcaoili was named the Chief Information Security Officer at Cox Communications in 2009.

He has helped shape cyber security best practices for U.S. Telecoms as a committee co-chair for the Federal Communications Commission (FCC) Communications Security, Reliability and Interoperability Council (CSRIC) II Work Group 2A (Cyber Security Best Practices) in 2010, served on the NCTA Cyber Security Work Group as an inaugural member, played an instrumental role in 2012 in the FCC CSRIC III  Work Group 11 (Consensus Cyber Security Controls), served as a committee co-chair for cyber security on the Communications Sector Coordinating Council (CSCC), was a member of the Communications Information Sharing and Analysis Center (Communications ISAC), and was an industry representative on the National Coordinating Center for Communications (NCCC).

He was inducted into the Ponemon Institute as a Distinguished Fellow in 2011 and then appointed the Chairman of the Ponemon Institute Distinguished Fellows in 2012.

He has been instrumental in shaping United States cyber security efforts. Throughout 2013 he helped the National Institute of Standards and Technology develop the first version of the U.S. Cybersecurity Framework (NIST CSF) released as the Framework for Improving Critical Infrastructure Cybersecurity (FICIC) on February 12, 2014.  In 2013, Agcaoili was appointed as a co-chair for the FCC CSRIC IV Working Group 4 – Cybersecurity Best Practices in order to help operationalize the Framework into practice within the Communications sector by updating and aligning his previous effort co-chairing the FCC CSRIC II Work Group 2A (Cyber Security Best Practices) with the NIST CSF.

Agcaoili was appointed the Vice President and Chief Information Security Officer of Elavon in 2014. He serves on the FS-ISAC  and on the Payments Processing Information Sharing Council (PPISC). steering committee. He was promoted to Senior Vice President at US Bank in 2015.

He was nominated to serve a two-year term on the Board of Advisors of the PCI Security Standards Council in 2015.

He has served on the Editorial Advisory Board for TechTarget Security Media Group Information Security Magazine, Advisory Board for CSO Magazine, Advisory Board for CIO Magazine, Editorial Advisory Board for CSO MAG, Governing Body Co-chair for Evanta CISO Leadership Network, Founding Advisory Council for CISO Executive Network in Atlanta, Founding Member and CISO Advisory Council for Wisegate,  Advisory Board for the RSA Executive Security Action Forum (ESAF), and advisory board for SecureWorld Expo in Atlanta, Houston, and Dallas. He has served 10 times as a judge for the Information Security Executive (ISE®) Awards  and was on the advisory board for the Worldwide Executive Council Goldman Sachs CISO Council and the Citibank CISO Council.

Information security and cyber security industry contributions 
 [American Institute of Certified Public Accountants (AICPA) endorsed Cloud Security Alliance (CSA) Position Paper on SOC Reports (SAS 70 and SSAE 16 replacement) https://web.archive.org/web/20131020224528/http://www.aicpa.org/interestareas/frc/assuranceadvisoryservices/downloadabledocuments/csa-position-paper-on-aicpa-service-organization-control-reports.pdf]
 [Cloud Security Alliance (CSA), founding member https://cloudsecurityalliance.org/about]
 [CSA Steering Committee, co-founder http://www.csoonline.com/article/2138561/data-protection/cloud-security-alliance-updates-controls-matrix.html]
 [CSA Cloud Controls Matrix (CCM), co-inventor and co-author https://cloudsecurityalliance.org/cm]
 [CSA GRC Stack, co-founder https://cloudsecurityalliance.org/research/grc-stack/]
 [CSA Security, Trust & Assurance Registry (STAR), co-founder https://cloudsecurityalliance.org/star]
 [CSA Computer Security Incident Response Team (CSIRT), founding member https://cloudsecurityalliance.org/research/cloudsirt/]
 [Hogan Lovells US LLP & Cyber Privacy Working Group - Preliminary Cybersecurity Framework – Privacy Methodology http://csrc.nist.gov/cyberframework/framework_comments/20131205_harriet_pearson_hoganlovells.pdf]
 [NIST Cybersecurity Framework (CSF) aka Framework for Improving Critical Infrastructure Cybersecurity (FICIC)  - Suggested Updates https://app.box.com/s/2qd8fs7d9xxdgmg7euhc]
 [FCC Communications Security, Reliability and Interoperability Council (CSRIC) II Work Group 2A (Cyber Security Best Practices), Committee co-chair http://transition.fcc.gov/pshs/docs/csric/WG2A-Cyber-Security-Best-Practices-Final-Report.pdf]
 [National Cable Television Association (NCTA) Cyber Security Working Group, inaugural member https://web.archive.org/web/20120104150859/http://www.ncta.com/DocumentBinary.aspx?id=968]
 [FCC Communications Security, Reliability and Interoperability Council (CSRIC) III Work Group 11 (Consensus Cyber Security Controls), CSCC cyber security sub-committee co-chair http://transition.fcc.gov/bureaus/pshs/advisory/csric3/CSRIC_III_WG11_Report_March_%202013.pdf]
 MSO (cable) Security Council, founding member
 MSO Acceptable Use Policy Management (AUPM) Roundtable, founding member
 Alliance for Telecommunications Industry Solutions Network Reliability Steering Committee (ATIS NRSC)
 [Information Systems Audit and Control Association (ISACA) Cloud Computing: Business Benefits With Security, Governance and Assurance Perspectives http://www.isaca.org/Knowledge-Center/Research/ResearchDeliverables/Pages/Cloud-Computing-Business-Benefits-With-Security-Governance-and-Assurance-Perspective.aspx] 
 [Electronic Discovery Reference Model (EDRM) Data Set Project https://web.archive.org/web/20141219104146/http://www.edrm.net/members/2011-2012/individuals]
 [IETF Capwap, Contributing Member ]
 [Risk-based vulnerability scanning ]

Recognition 
 [1991 Inducted into the Rensselaer Polytechnic Institute Phi chapter of the Pi Tau Sigma https://web.archive.org/web/20150118085230/http://www.pitausigma.net/Chapters/upload/6-Rensselaer-Phi-1990-1999.pdf]
 [1998 InfoWorld - Network Hardware: Product of the Year Award (IDI Fort Knox) http://findarticles.com/p/articles/mi_m0EIN/is_1999_Feb_15/ai_53875599/]
 [2005-2007 Microsoft Most Valuable Professional (MVP) in Security https://web.archive.org/web/20070303203154/http://mvp.support.microsoft.com/]
 [2007-2008 Microsoft Most Valuable Professional (MVP) in Enterprise Security http://mvp.support.microsoft.com]
 [2008 Microsoft CSO Summit Excellence in Data Protection Award (Dell) http://mvp.support.microsoft.com ]
 [2008 Information Security Project of the Year North American Award Nominee (Dell) http://www.ten-inc.com/press/2008/press_2008.11.18.asp]
 [2009 Information Security Executive (ISE®) of the Year Central Executive Award Winner (Dell) http://www.ten-inc.com/press/2009/press_2009.04.07.asp]
 [2010 Information Security Magazine Security 7 Award in Telecommunications] (Cox Communications) 
 [2011 Inducted into the East Greenbush Education Foundation Hall of Fame http://www.egedfoundation.org/hall%20of%20fame%20bios/Phil%20Agcaoili%20Bio.pdf]
 [2011 Named Ponemon Institute Distinguished Fellow http://www.ponemon.org/ponemon-institute-fellows]
 [2012 Veracode Bridge Builder Award (Cox Communications) http://www.businesswire.com/news/home/20120314006268/en/Veracode-Honors-Blue-Shield-California-Cox-Communications]
 [2012 RSA Conference Award for Excellence in the Field of Security Practices  ]
 [2012 Named Chairman of the Ponemon Institute Fellows http://www.ponemon.org/ponemon-institute-fellows#agcaoili]
 [2012 Information Security Executive (ISE®) of the Decade Southeast Award Winner] (Cox Communications) http://www.ten-inc.com/press/2012/press_2012.03.14.asp]
 [2013 Evanta Top 25 Breakaway Leader Award http://www.evanta.com/ciso/summits/global/481/page/3549]
 [2014 CEOWorld Magazine Top Chief Security Officers (CSOs) to Follow on Twitter http://ceoworld.biz/2014/04/04/top-chief-security-officers-csos-to-follow-on-twitter-198120]
 [2014 Evanta Top 25 Breakaway Leader Award http://www.evanta.com/ciso/summits/global/page/4108 ]
[2017 Corporate Executive Board (CEB) Top 10 Breakaway Leadership Award https://www.epicos.com/article/311202/evanta-announces-winners-global-ciso-executive-summit-breakaway-leadership-awards]
[14 Social Media-Savvy CISOs to Follow on Twitter https://www.darkreading.com/careers-and-people/14-social-media-savvy-cisos-to-follow-on-twitter/d/d-id/1329663?image_number=13]
[Top 100 Security Influencers To Follow in 2019 (listed in 01–20) - CISO Platform http://top100.cisoplatform.com/top-100-influencers/]

References

Chief security officers
Rensselaer Polytechnic Institute alumni
Virginia Tech alumni#Business.2C government.2C and academia
Georgia State University alumni
Living people
Year of birth missing (living people)